Margaretta Large "Happy" Rockefeller (née Fitler, formerly Murphy; June 9, 1926 – May 19, 2015) was a philanthropist and the second wife of the 49th governor of New York and 41st vice president of the United States, Nelson Rockefeller (1908–1979). She was the first lady of New York from 1963 to 1973, and the second lady of the United States from 1974 to 1977.

Childhood and family
Margaretta Large Fitler was born at Bryn Mawr, Pennsylvania, in 1926. Her parents were Margaretta Large Harrison and  William Wonderly Fitler Jr., an heir to a cordage fortune.  Her mother would subsequently remarry. The younger Margaretta was known by her nickname, "Happy", given to her for her childhood disposition. She was a great-granddaughter of Philadelphia mayor Edwin Henry Fitler and a great-great-granddaughter of Union general George Gordon Meade, the commander at the Battle of Gettysburg, and his wife Margaretta Sergeant, daughter of politician John Sergeant.

Marriages

On December 11, 1949, she married James Slater Murphy, a virologist associated with the Rockefeller Institute and a close friend of Nelson Rockefeller's. They had four children: James B. Murphy, II, Margaretta Harrison Murphy, Carol Slater Murphy, and Malinda Fitler Murphy (1960–2005). Malinda married Francis Menotti, the adopted son of composer Gian Carlo Menotti.

Happy and her husband divorced on April 1, 1963, for reasons The New York Times called "grievous mental anguish" and her former husband's lawyer classified as "irreconcilable differences".  One month later – on May 4, 1963 – at the home of Laurance S. Rockefeller in Pocantico Hills, New York, Happy married Governor Nelson Rockefeller, who had taken office in 1959 and was eighteen years her senior. She had worked as a member of his office staff until her resignation in 1961. Nelson divorced his first wife, Mary Todhunter Clark, on March 16, 1962. Happy and Nelson Rockefeller had two sons together: Nelson Rockefeller Jr. (born 1964), and Mark Rockefeller (born 1967).

At the time, Happy Murphy's relationship with Gov. Rockefeller was controversial. As the British journalist Lady Jeanne Campbell wrote in the London Evening Standard, when the Murphy-Rockefeller involvement became a subject of media scrutiny after the announcement of Rockefeller's filing for divorce from his first wife and Happy Murphy's resignation from his staff, "Already people are comparing Happy Murphy to the Duchess of Windsor when she was plain Mrs. Simpson." More damaging still was the political fallout for Rockefeller. Echoing the party-wide concerns, an official of the Michigan Republican Party told The New York Times that the couple's potential marriage likely would cost Rockefeller the 1964 presidential nomination. "The rapidity of it all—he gets a divorce, she gets a divorce—and the indication of the break-up of two homes. Our country doesn't like broken homes."

Despite some people's disapproval, Rockefeller was re-elected as governor twice more and served until 1973, when he resigned. He was appointed Vice President of the United States by President Gerald Ford, after Richard Nixon resigned, and served from 1974 to 1977.

There has been speculation surrounding Malinda Fitler Menotti, the youngest daughter of Happy Rockefeller and Dr. James Slater Murphy, with many in the Rockefeller inner circle believing her to be Nelson Rockefeller's daughter.  In his diary, Rockefeller intimate Ken Riland used a tone of knowing irony when mentioning Malinda, putting the word stepfather in quotes. Ellen, the wife of Wally Harrison, the architect and Nelson Rockefeller confidant, claimed that Malinda's parentage was an open secret among Rockefeller associates.

Health and death
She was a breast cancer survivor, having undergone a double mastectomy in 1974, two weeks after Betty Ford, then First Lady of the United States, underwent a single mastectomy. Happy Rockefeller died on May 19, 2015, at the age of 88, following a short illness.

See also

 Rockefeller family

References

|-

1926 births
2015 deaths
American socialites
First ladies and gentlemen of New York (state)
New York (state) Republicans
People from Bryn Mawr, Pennsylvania
People from Manhattan
Rockefeller family
Second ladies of the United States
Meade family